Frederick Middleton "Penny" Bailey (August 16, 1895 – August 16, 1972) was a  Major League Baseball outfielder. He played three seasons with the Boston Braves from 1916 to 1918.

References

External links

Toronto Maple Leafs (International League) players
Columbus Senators players
Hartford Senators players
Boston Braves players
Major League Baseball outfielders
1895 births
1972 deaths
Baseball players from West Virginia
People from Mount Hope, West Virginia